Coixtlahuaca District is located in the northeast of the Mixteca Region of the State of Oaxaca, Mexico. As of 2005 the population was 9,018, down 2.8% from 2000.

The region is generally from 2,000m to 3,000m high, mostly hilly or mountainous with small plains.
Temperatures range from 3°C to 36°C.
Much of the area has been deforested and rainfall has decreased in recent years, affecting production of the standard crops of corn, wheat, beans and barley.
It is the traditional home of the Chocho people, although they are now a small minority.
The population has been shrinking due to emigration for economic reasons.

Municipalities

The district includes the following municipalities:
Concepción Buenavista,
San Cristóbal Suchixtlahuaca,
San Francisco Teopan,
San Juan Bautista Coixtlahuaca,
San Mateo Tlapiltepec,
San Miguel Tequixtepec,
San Miguel Tulancingo,
Santa Magdalena Jicotlán,
Santa María Nativitas,
Santiago Ihuitlán Plumas,
Santiago Tepetlapa,
Tepelmeme Villa de Morelos and 
Tlacotepec Plumas.

See also
Municipalities of Oaxaca

References

Districts of Oaxaca
Mixteca Region